Pincombe Down is a 23.8 hectare biological Site of Special Scientific Interest in southwest Wiltshire, England, notified in 1971. The site lies in Alvediston and Berwick St John parishes.

Sources

 Natural England citation sheet for the site (accessed 11 April 2022)

External links
 Natural England website (SSSI information)

Sites of Special Scientific Interest in Wiltshire
Sites of Special Scientific Interest notified in 1971